Sugar free foods use sugar substitutes for sweetness.

Sugar free may also refer to:
Sugarfree (Filipino band), a Filipino Indiepop/rock band
Sugarfree (Italian band), Italian pop-rock band from Catania, Sicily
"Sugar Free" (song), a 1986 song by Wa Wa Nee from Wa Wa Nee
"Sugar Free", a song by Diana Ross from Every Day Is a New Day
"Sugar Free", a song by the Mighty Mighty Bosstones from A Jackknife to a Swan
"Sugar Free", a song by Hedley from Hedley
"Sugar Free", a song by T-ara from And & End

See also
Diet food